David Stant is a football coach; currently head coach of the Keio Unicorns.

Playing career

High school
Stant graduated from Kahuku High School in 1981.

College
After high school Stant played for Southern Oregon, until a knee injury ended his career. He would later go on to play linebacker at Arizona Western on scholarship, then at Hawaii.

X-League
Stant did not enter the NFL Draft, but rather went to Japan to play in the X-League 1990 after being scouted by the Recruit Seagulls. He started his coaching career for the Seagulls after the X-League ruled against allowing import foreign players at that time..

Coaching career

Obic
In 1990, the Recruit Seagulls hired Stant to also be defensive coordinator. He also took over as offensive coordinator the next season and was promoted to head coach the next season 1993 and stayed through 1999. He would then serve as a consultant for the team the next three seasons.

IBM
In 2003, the IBM Big Blue hired Stant as their new head coach. He would stay with the team until 2006, where he compiled a 9–11–1 record.

Kamehameha Schools Kapālama High School
In February 2007, Stant was selected to serve as Kamehameha Schools Kapālama High School's new varsity head football coach. He would lead the Warriors to an HHSAA state championship and an ILH championship in 2009. The Warriors would also finish 2nd in the ILD Division II in the following 3 seasons before Stant stepped down as head coach to take the head coaching position at Keio University in Japan.

Keio University
In 2013, Stant became the head coach of the Keio Unicorns.

Head coaching record

College

X-League

References

External links

  at Keio Unicorns

1964 births
Living people
American football linebackers
Place of birth missing (living people)
Hawaii Rainbow Warriors football players
American football in Japan
Southern Oregon Raiders football players
University of Hawaiʻi alumni
American expatriate sportspeople in Japan